Leto is a 2018 Russian musical film directed by Kirill Serebrennikov that depicts the Leningrad underground rock scene of the early 1980s. The film draws loosely from the lives of the Soviet rock musicians Viktor Tsoi and Mike Naumenko. It was selected to compete for the Palme d'Or at the 2018 Cannes Film Festival, where it won the Cannes Soundtrack Award. Leto also won the Best Production Designer at the 2018 European Film Awards.

Plot
The film is set in the summer of the early 1980s in Leningrad. The main storyline of the film tells the story of the relationship between the 19-year-old Viktor Tsoi (Teo Yoo), 26-year-old Mike Naumenko (Roman Bilyk), and Naumenko's girlfriend Natalia (Irina Starshenbaum), as well as the formation of the Leningrad Rock Club and the recording of Kino's first album, 45.

The film's setting, the Leningrad Rock Club, was one of the few state-permitted public performance spaces for rock musicians in its time. The Club is generally a theatrical venue for boundary-pushing music, where audiences are instructed to sit politely and listen rather than mosh. However, interjections by narrator Skeptic (Alexander Kuznetsov) occasionally recast the club as extravagant, hedonistic, reckless, and dangerous. The musicians live frugally; their indulgences are creative rather than material.

Much of the narrative focuses on Mike, the frontman of one of the Club's more popular, old-guard bands, and his girlfriend Natacha, whose close, initially monogamous relationship stands in contrast to the expected behavior of rockstars. Also significant to the plot is Viktor, a quiet, slightly otherworldly young man with a knack for melody and a beguilingly peculiar turn of lyrical phrase. Natacha is the first to notice a kind of melancholic magic about Viktor, as the film gradually reorients itself around his budding stardom rather than Mike's less obviously ascending career. However, the film maintains a more general look at the musicians in the club, including the various musicians who come in and out of the lives of the protagonists.

The film's musical numbers alternate between diegetic stage performances and sudden flights of music-video fancy. In one such performance, an altercation between musicians and more conservative citizens on a packed train escalates into a demented, carriage-traversing singalong of Talking Heads' "Psycho Killer," the hitherto realist imagery disrupted with early-MTV-style cartoon flourishes. There are a few sequences in which Mike and the other Leningrad rockers seize their moment, using their music to defy the bureaucrats and wow audiences. However, nearly of these scenes all followed by a caveat to the effect of "this didn’t really happen."

Cast
 Teo Yoo as Viktor Tsoi (Kino singer)
 Roman Bilyk (Zveri vocalist) as Mike Naumenko 
 Irina Starshenbaum as Natasha Naumenko 
 Filipp Avdeyev as Lyosha (prot. Alexei Rybin, first guitarist of Kino)
 Evgeniy Serzin as Oleg (prot. Oleg Valinskiy, first drummer of Kino)
 Alexander Gorchilin as Punk (prot. Andrey «Svin» Panov, frontman of Avtomaticheskie udovletvoriteli)
 Yuliya Aug as Tatyana Ivanova, head of Leningrad Rock Club
 Nikita Yefremov as Bob (prot. Boris Grebenshchikov)
 Georgy Kudrenko as Zhora
 Nikita Yelenev as Virus
 Alexandra Revenko as Mariana's friend I
 Liya Akhedzhakova as apartment owner
 Anton Adasinsky as apartment owner
 Yelena Koreneva as woman in red
 Aleksandr Bashirov as angry man on train
 Seva Novgorodsev as antiquarian
 Vasily Mikhailov as Isha
 Aleksandr Kuznetsov as skeptic
 Andrey Khodorchenkov as Artemy Troitsky

Production
Filming began in July 2017 in St. Petersburg. At the end of August 2017, Serebrennikov was arrested, deported to Moscow on charges of fraud, and placed under house arrest. Nevertheless, by February 2018 he managed to finish the film without violating the prohibitions imposed by the court, as he completed his work using a computer not connected to the Internet. A few unfinished scenes were finished using his notes and based on previous rehearsals. Initial stills from the film were shown in the edition of 2 February 2018 of Variety.

Music
The film features the music of Kino and other Soviet rock bands. The soundtrack also includes covers of The Talking Heads' "Psycho Killer", Iggy Pop's "Passenger", Lou Reed's "Perfect Day", and David Bowie's "All the Young Dudes" by contemporary Russian artists, such as Glintshake and Shortparis. Leto won the Cannes Soundtrack Award.

Reception

Critical response
Allocine's review aggregator gave the film a score of 4.4 out of 5, with numerous outlets placing the film among the world's top films of 2018.

The site's critical consensus reads, "A love story set against the backdrop of a pivotal moment in Russian culture, Leto captures people -- and a generation -- in thrilling flux." Metacritic gives the film a weighted average score of 69 out of 100, based on 17 critics, indicating "generally favorable reviews".

Ben Sachs, the top critic from the Chicago Reader, gave a positive review of the film: "If you can disregard the derivativeness, this has some decent music and charismatic performances, and it provides some insights into the Western aspirations of Soviet youth culture." By contrast, Ty Burr from The Boston Globe stated, "Maybe you had to be there, but it's a movie's job to take us, and this one gets only partway."

Published by the New York Times, Jeannette Catsoulis states, “Kirill Serebrennikov’s gentle mood piece brings an underground music scene to vivid life.”

Music community
On 15 February 2018, the film was criticized by musician Boris Grebenshchikov, who felt that the script of the film was "a lie from beginning to end."

Alexei Rybin, one of the founders of Kino, criticized the script and forbade the use of his image in the film. The film was sharply criticized by the music producer Andrei Tropillo, who described the director Serebrennikov as "a man alien to rock culture and who knows nothing about it". Music critic Artemy Troitsky agreed that the script "causes great doubts", but urged people to wait for the finished film.

References

External links
 
 
 

2018 films
2018 drama films
2018 biographical drama films
Films directed by Kirill Serebrennikov
2010s Russian-language films
Russian rock music films
Russian biographical drama films
Biographical films about singers
Films set in 1981
Films set in Saint Petersburg
Films set in the Soviet Union
Films shot in Saint Petersburg
Cultural depictions of rock musicians
Cultural depictions of Russian men